Lenzie Maurice Jackson (born June 17, 1977) is a retired National Football League kick returner and Arena Football League wide receiver/defensive back.

High school years
Jackson attended Milpitas High School in Milpitas, California and was a letterman in football and track & field.

College career
Jackson played college football for the Arizona State Sun Devils.

Professional career
Jackson played in the NFL for the Jacksonville Jaguars (1999), the Cleveland Browns (2000), and the Pittsburgh Steelers (2001–2002). He played in the AFL for the Carolina Cobras (2004), the Columbus Destroyers (2005), and the Los Angeles Avengers (2006–2007).

Notes

External links
 Profile at AFL.com

1977 births
Living people
People from Milpitas, California
American football return specialists
American football wide receivers
American football defensive backs
Arizona State Sun Devils football players
Jacksonville Jaguars players
Cleveland Browns players
Pittsburgh Steelers players
Carolina Cobras players
Columbus Destroyers players
Los Angeles Avengers players
Players of American football from California
Sportspeople from Santa Clara County, California